The Piepenbrock Prize for Sculpture was a biennial sculpture prize awarded in Berlin, Germany, by the Kulturstiftung Hartwig Piepenbrock, a cultural foundation established by . It was awarded from 1988 to 2008; the first five prizes were limited to the German-speaking world. At €50,000, it was the highest-valued sculpture prize in Europe.

Recipients
 1988: Max Bill
 1990: 
 1992: 
 1994: 
 1996: Erwin Heerich
 1998: Ulrich Rückriem
 2000: Eduardo Chillida
 2002: Tony Cragg
 2004: Dani Karavan
 2006: Rebecca Horn
 2008: Katharina Fritsch

An associated grant or bursary, the Piepenbrock Förderpreis für Skulptur, was also awarded to promising sculptors.

References

German awards
Sculpture awards
1988 establishments in Germany
2008 disestablishments in Germany
Awards established in 1988
Awards disestablished in 2008
Biennial events